John D'Arcy (22 August 1935 – 29 September 2019) was an Australian rules footballer who played with Richmond in the Victorian Football League (VFL).

Notes

External links 		
		
		
	
		
		
2019 deaths		
1935 births		
Australian rules footballers from Victoria (Australia)		
Richmond Football Club players
Oakleigh Football Club players